Meir Porush (born 11 June 1955) is an Israeli politician who has served as a member of the Knesset for the Haredi Agudat Yisrael faction of United Torah Judaism in several spells since 1996. He served as the Deputy Minister of Education.

Biography
Meir Porush was born in Jerusalem. His father Rabbi Menachem Porush (1916–2010) was one of the longest-serving Knesset members. Meir was educated in a yeshiva. After leaving yeshiva, he served in the IDF, and supports further Haredi participation in military service. Porush lives in Jerusalem with his wife and twelve children.

Political career
Before entering the Knesset, Porush was as a member of the Jerusalem City Council for thirteen years. He also served as deputy mayor of Jerusalem. He ran unsuccessfully in the 1983 Jerusalem mayoral election as the Agudat Yisrael nominee. He ran for the mayoralty again in 1989, but was again unsuccessful.

He was first elected to the Knesset in the 1996 elections as an Agudat Yisrael candidate on the United Torah Judaism list, and was appointed Deputy Minister of Housing in Binyamin Netanyahu's first government.

Porush retained his seat in the 1999 elections, and chaired the Knesset inquiry into financial problems of local councils. After Ariel Sharon won a special election for Prime Minister in 2001, Porush was appointed Deputy Minister of Housing and Construction.

He retained his seat in the 2003 elections. In 2005, he caused controversy by saying that then PM Ariel Sharon reminded him of Benito Mussolini. He was re-elected again in 2006, and ran for Mayor of Jerusalem in 2008, losing to the Likud politician Nir Barkat, by 50% to 42%.

Porush retained his Knesset seat in the 2009 elections, and was appointed Deputy Minister of Education in Netanyahu's second government. However, he resigned on 6 February 2011, as part of a seat rotation agreement. He was re-elected again in 2013 and 2015, and was appointed Deputy Minister of Education in the Netanyahu's fourth government formed in May 2015.

In March 2016, Porush was reprimanded by the Knesset ethics committee for saying that the "Women of the Wall" should be "thrown to the dogs". Porush responded by saying that if "Women of the Wall" refrained from eating non-kosher food, he would apologize to them.

In May 2016, he resigned from the Knesset to allow Ya'akov Asher to take his place as part of the rotation agreement between the parties in United Torah Judaism. He returned to the Knesset in 2019, but resigned his seat in June 2020 after being appointed Deputy Minister of Education, allowing Yitzhak Pindros to take his seat.

References

External links

1955 births
Living people
Agudat Yisrael politicians
Deputy Mayors of Jerusalem
Deputy ministers of Israel
Haredi rabbis in Israel
Israeli Jews
Jewish Israeli politicians
Members of the 14th Knesset (1996–1999)
Members of the 15th Knesset (1999–2003)
Members of the 16th Knesset (2003–2006)
Members of the 17th Knesset (2006–2009)
Members of the 18th Knesset (2009–2013)
Members of the 19th Knesset (2013–2015)
Members of the 20th Knesset (2015–2019)
Members of the 21st Knesset (2019)
Members of the 22nd Knesset (2019–2020)
Members of the 23rd Knesset (2020–2021)
Members of the 24th Knesset (2021–2022)
Members of the 25th Knesset (2022–)
Politicians from Jerusalem
Rabbinic members of the Knesset
United Torah Judaism leaders
Ministers without Portfolio of Israel